Darla Einstein Forrester is a fictional character from the CBS soap opera The Bold and the Beautiful, played by Schae Harrison from 1989 to July 18, 2006; also appearing as a ghost in July 2007, March, April, and November 2014, and in June and July 2015.

Casting
Harrison debuted in the role in January 1989, and departed in July 2006, when her character was killed off after being accidentally run over by Taylor Hayes, but made additional appearances in July 2007 as a ghost. On January 29, 2014, Michael Logan from TV Guide reported that Harrison had reprised her role and would be returning to the show. A representative for the show said Harrison would feature in three episodes airing from March 18. The episodes saw Darla appear to her now-teenage daughter Aly (Ashlyn Pearce) as a ghost. She made additional appearances in November of the same year. In May 2015, Harrison confirmed via Twitter that she would be returning as Darla again as a ghost. Harrison said that she had an "awesome story line".

Reception
During a feature on what storylines were working and not working for the show, a Soap World reporter thought Darla's return to help out Aly was "a disaster". The reporter wondered why the producers brought back a popular character if they were not going to use all of her, saying "forcing a fun and effervescent actress like Schae Harrison to play a 'dismembered floating head' is stupid."

References

External links

The Bold and the Beautiful characters
Fictional secretaries
Television characters introduced in 1989
Female characters in television
Forrester family